Al-Dibis Sport Club, is an Iraqi football team based in Dibis District, Kirkuk, that plays in Iraq Division Two.

Managerial history
 Abbas Rasheed
 Ghassan Mohammed

Famous players
Younis Mahmoud (1997–1999)

See also 
 2001–02 Iraq FA Cup
 2020–21 Iraq FA Cup

References

External links
 Al-Dibis SC on Goalzz.com
 Iraq Clubs- Foundation Dates

1991 establishments in Iraq
Association football clubs established in 1991
Football clubs in Kirkuk